The Viña del Mar International Song Festival 2011 was released from February 21, 2011 until Saturday February 26, 2011. The musical event was broadcast for first time via Chilean TV channel Chilevisión.

Licitation
The new tender for the festival, was awarded to Chilean television channel Chilevisión, which submitted a bid to 1,316,368 UF, equivalent to $28,565,238,082 (CLP), and $52,383,668.40 (USD). The other offers Delivered by the other two interested TV channels were: Mega with 60,888 UF, equivalent to $1,321,272,028 (CLP), and $2,422,982.63 (USD) and TVN with 862,112 UF, equivalent to $18,707,864,771 (CLP), and $34,306,963.65 (USD). Finally, the international festival was committed to Chilevisión for the next four years, until 2014.

Development
On July 1, 2010, Vicente Sabatini was the tentative director of the event but Alex Hernández was later confirmed, and the pre-party show will be released on February 18, 2011 in Viña del Mar. The first artists who have contacted by the organizing committee to form part of the show are the Puerto Rican Latin pop singer Chayanne which his song "Me Enamoré de Ti" from his album No Hay Imposibles peaked at number-one for one week in the Chilean singles chart, during 2010 and archived a gold certification in the country for the sales of the record, and Brazilian Roberto Carlos, both have already been presented in this stage in previous editions. Bon Jovi is another artist who is in negotiations, which schedule a concert in Santiago in late 2010.

Ricky Martin, Peter Cetera, former lead singer and bassist of Chicago, Argentine rocker Andrés Calamaro and teen pop sensation and success of ticket sales in her concerts in Chile, Demi Lovato are the next names in the tentative list of performers for the main show.

On July 4, 2010, Pablo Morales, content manager of the organizing committee, developed a list of the first artists who will be shuffled to the show, inside of which is composed of the above names, together with them, topped the list by the teen idol Justin Bieber, who with his album My Worlds debuted at the first position of the best-selling albums in Chile and where it appears his single "Baby" featuring Ludacris, a song which topped the Chilean singles chart for two consecutive weeks. Along with Bieber, the Spanish and multi-platinum singer Julio Iglesias, Juanes and Ana Gabriel.

On August 3, 2010, the Spanish singer Alejandro Sanz was added to priority list thanks to success of his latest album Paraíso Express, which peaked at number ten in Chile, his singles from that album "Looking for Paradise" topped the Chilean charts and "Desde Cuándo" reached Top 5, on August later Sanz was confirmed as the first main artist to be performing, he also confirmed that the show in Viña del Mar will be his last date for the international tour Paraíso Express. Diego Torres also appears in the priority list, his single "Guapa" peaked at top position in Chile for two consecutive weeks during May 2010. Chilean rock band Lucybell told in an interview with La Tercera that they are in conversations to be in the main show festival, also they released the album Fénix on early August which debuted at number two in Chile.

On August 20, 2010, the Mexican singer and actress Yuri was confirmed as judge for the international competition, along with the former member of Sin Bandera, Noel Schajris. Marco Antonio Solís was confirmed too as part of the main show and he is the socond act in the line-up, he performed in its stage two-times before.

Calle 13, Lionel Richie and Phil Collins are in tentative list of the festival. Another who comes to the event is Michael Bublé. The Canadian was asked to perform at the Quinta Vergara, but the intention of the Festival team is also involved in the pre-gala to be held in the Casino of the city and will be broadcast live. On September 9, 2010, during the release of Yo Soy, third solo studio album from Chilean tropical singer Américo, his manager confirmed that the negotiations are advanced for the artist returns to the stage of Viña del Mar.

On September 24, 2010, Puerto Rican Latin pop singer Chayanne was confirmed as the third musician to perform in the show, this performance will be his seventh time in the music show and is the second artist that performed more times only behind Miguel Bosé with eight times. The 2010 press tour for the event was confirmed be held between 18 and October 25 for different cities of United States, like Miami, Las Vegas and Los Angeles.

On November 3, 2010, performances by the Chilean Tropical singer Américo and Dominican-American bachata music group Aventura were officially confirmed as part of the main show. On December 6, 2010, Brazilian singer Roberto Carlos, American rapper Pitbull, Calle 13, along with Carlos Baute and Marta Sánchez were confirmed for the main show. On December 10, 2010, English musician and The Police former member Sting is added to the international line up for the event, he has performed in this festival along with his band The Police during the 1982 edition.

On February 18, was broadcast live the red carpet efor the official presentation event of the festival from the Casino de Viña del Mar. The transmission gained an audience of 2.8 million viewers and was the most watched of the week in the country.

Hosts
In Chilevisión have analyzed the possibility of the Chilean former Miss Universe Cecilia Bolocco with Spanish singer Miguel Bosé as hosts for the event. The TV station has time limit to announce the hosts of the show until October 2010, another name which is also in negotiations is Rafael Araneda. Araneda would have made a contract proposal for 200 million Chilean pesos (400,000 dollars) to host the festival this year and the next three issues.

On November 3, 2010, Rafael Araneda was confirmed as host of the event. On December 6, 2010 Eva Gómez was confirmed as the co-host.

Confirmed performers
 Alejandro Sanz
 Marco Antonio Solís
 Chayanne
 Américo
 Aventura
 Los Jaivas
 Roberto Carlos
 Pitbull
 Calle 13
 Sting
 Luis Véliz
 Villa Cariño

Judges
 Yuri
 Noel Schajris
 Carlos Baute
 Jordi Castell
 Fernanda Urrejola
 Alvaro Morales
 Tito Fernández
 Juan Salazar
 Pablo Aguilera

Chronology

Day 1

Day 2

Day 3

Day 4

Day 5

Day 6

Participants

International competition

Folk competition

References

External links
 Official website (Spanish)

Viña del Mar International Song Festival by year
Vina Del Mar International Song Festival, 2011
2011 festivals in Chile
2011 music festivals